This is a discography of American alternative metal band AM Conspiracy currently consists of one studio album, one EP and three singles.

Studio albums

EP

Singles

Song appearances in media and soundtracks

In 2007, AM Conspiracy contributed two songs, "Right on Time" and "Welt", to the video game WWE Smackdown vs Raw 2008.
In 2009, AM Conspiracy contributed two songs, "Welt" and the unreleased "High", to the film Bitch Slap.

Heavy metal group discographies
Discographies of American artists